Moshe Ivgy (born 29 November 1953) is an Israeli actor and director.

Biography
Moshe Ivgy was born in Casablanca, Morocco, to a Moroccan Jewish family. He was married to actress Irit Sheleg. Their daughter Dana Ivgy is also an actress. After divorcing Irit, he married Oreet, with whom he has two children, Ella and Lily.

Ivgy experimented with Scientology and spent some six months studying its teachings. He abandoned it, stating "it is an insane business... Those at the top earn billions and he (the average member) is destitute."

Acting and directing career

Ivgy directed And on the Third Day. He co-starred with his daughter Dana in the 2010 film Hayu Leilot.

Controversy

In February 2016, the Israeli media reported that Ivgy was accused by several women of sexual harassment.

In May 2018, Ivgy was indicted in Haifa Magistrates Court on charges of sexual harassment and indecent acts against four women.

Three of the four accusers are actresses who worked with Ivgy on film-sets and in the theater. The fourth woman had no prior acquaintance with Ivgy. He approached her in a falafel shop and made unsolicited sexually explicit comments to her.

In January 2020, Ivgy was convicted of indecent assault against four women but acquitted of more serious charges. His sentence, involving a fine and six months' community service, was considered by feminist groups as "lenient towards a serial offender."

He was sentenced to 6 months of community service, 6 months of probation, and compensation to the complainant in the amount of NIS 10,000.

On July 12, 2021, a Haifa Magistrate court sentenced Ivgy to 11 months for indecent assault.

He was released from prison on March 14, 2022.

Filmography

Kohav Hashahar (1980)
Indiani Ba'Shemesh (1981) - Atias
Mitahat La'af (Under the Nose, 1982) (a.k.a. Big Shots, directed by Jacob Goldwasser) - Hertzel
Gabi Ben Yakar (1982)
Adon Leon (1982) - Momo Danino
Kuni Leml B'Kahir (1983)
The Ambassador (1984) - Arab Student
Every Time We Say Goodbye (1986) - Daniel
Bread (Lehem, 1986) - Baruch
Ha-Krav Al HaVa'ad (1986) - Rafik
Deadline (1987) - Adbul
Mis'chakim Ba'Horef (1988)
The Lookout (1990) - Asher Yashurun
Cup Final (Gmar Gavi'a, 1991) - Cohen
Malachim B'Ruah (1992) - Michel
The Mummy Lives (1993) - Ali
The Revenge of Itzik Finkelstein (Nikmato Shel Itzik Finkelstein, 1993) - Itzik Finkelstein
The Patriots (1994) - Oron
Sipur Shematchil Belevaya Shel Nachash (1994) - Monsieur Robert
Max V'Morris (1994) - Morris
Love Sick (Hole Ahava B'Shikun Gimel, 1995) - Victor
Sof Hamis'chak (1996) - Aviad
Ha-Dybbuk B'sde Hatapuchim Hakdoshim (1997) - Azriel
Day After Day (Yom Yom, 1998) - Moshe
Dangerous Acts (1998) - Yisarael
Arim B'Layla (1998)
Aaron Cohen's Debt (1999) - Aaron Cohen
Zman Avir (1999) - Haim
The Investigation Must Go On (2000) - Shalom Shalom
Asphalt Zahov (2000)
Sipuray Bate Kafe (2003)
Haïm Ze Haïm (2003)
Spartan (2004) - Avi
Campfire (2004) - Yossi
Metallic Blues (2004) - Siso Ben-Hamo
Munich (2005, directed by Steven Spielberg) - Mike Harari
The Arbitrator (Ha-Borer, 2007-2014, TV Series) - Baruch Asulin 'The Arbitrator'
Restless (2008, directed by Amos Kollek) - Moshe
Shiva (2008) - Haim Ohayon
Etsba Elohim (2008) - Israel
Ultimatum (2009) - Professeur Feist
Haiu Leilot (There Were Nights, 2010) - Izhak Ben Shmuel
VeBaYom HaShlishi (2010) - Elisha
My Lovely Sister (2011) - Robert
Haolam Mats'hik (2012) - Professor Pestil
Lean neelam Moshe Ivgy (2012) - Himself
Menatek Ha-maim (2012)
Youth (2013) - Moti Cooper
Hasored (2013) - Hezi
Hunting Elephants (2013) - Deddy
Love Letter to Cinema (2014)
Zaguri Imperia (2014-2015, TV Series) - Albert Zaguri
The 90 Minute War (2016, directed by Eyal Halfon)
Amor (2016)

Awards and recognition

Israeli Academy Awards
2004, Nominated, Best Actor—Campfire (Medurat Hashevet)
2004, Won, Best Supporting Actor—Metallic Blues
2000, Nominated, Best Supporting Actor—The Investigation Must Go On (Haboleshet Hokeret)

Other 
At the 2016 Haifa International Film Festival, Moshe Ivgy and Norman Issa shared the prize for Best Actor in a Feature Film, for The 90 Minute War.

References

External links

1953 births
Living people
Israeli male film actors
Israeli male television actors
Moroccan emigrants to Israel
Israeli people of Moroccan-Jewish descent
Israeli Mizrahi Jews
People from Casablanca
People from Migdal HaEmek
20th-century Israeli male actors
21st-century Israeli male actors
Former Scientologists